is a Japanese light novelist. His works can be found under both spellings of his name, his works in English translation under 'Coda' and his works in Japanese under 'Kouda'.  His series Missing has been adapted into a manga, and Tokyopop released two in the series, 2007 to 2008, before it went bankrupt. He is known for basing his horror novels on research into psychology and folklore.

Works

Missing series 
 Missing: Kamikakushi no Monogatari, July 2001 ; Spirited Away , November 2007
 Missing 2: Noroi no Monogatari, October 2001 ; Letter of Misfortune , March 2008
 Missing 3: Kubikukuri no Monogatari, January 2002 ; The Hanged Man, scheduled for September 2008, didn't happen.
 Missing 4: Kubikukuri no Monogatari Kanketsuhen, March 2002
 Missing 5: Mekakushi no Monogatari, June 2002
 Missing 6: Awasekagami no Monogatari, October 2002
 Missing 7: Awasekagami no Monogatari Kanketsuhen, January 2003
 Missing 8: Ikenie no Monogatari, May 2003
 Missing 9: Zashiki-warashi no Monogatari, October 2003
 Missing 10: Zoku Zashiki-warashi no Monogatari, January 2004
 Missing 11: Zashiki-warashi no Monogatari Kanketsuhen, July 2004
 Missing 12: Kamioroshi no Monogatari, March, 2005
 Missing 13: Kamioroshi no Monogatari Kanketsuhen, June 2005
 Ya Ma,

Dansho no Grimm / Grimm Fragments series 
 Dansho no Grimm 1: Haikaburi, 
 Dansho no Grimm 2: Hansel and Gretal, 
 Dansho no Grimm 3: Ningyohime Beginning,  ; of the Little Mermaid
 Dansho no Grimm 4: Ningyohime Finale, 
 Dansho no Grimm 5: Akazukin Beginning, 
 Dansho no Grimm 6: Akazukin Finale, 
 Dansho no Grimm 7: Kin no tamago o umu mendori, 2008 ; Hen that lays eggs of gold
 Dansho no Grimm 8: Nadeshiko Beginning

Other works 
 Magic Night Kai, 2010 
 Magic Night Odd, 2010

References

1977 births
Living people
Light novelists
21st-century Japanese novelists
Japanese horror writers